Sascha Karolin Aulepp (born 24 September 1970) is a German judge and politician of the Social Democratic Party (SPD) who has been serving as State Minister for Children and Education in the government of Mayor Andreas Bovenschulte since 2021.

Early life and career 
Aulepp was born 1970 in Hanau and studied jurisprudence and became an attorney at law in 2001.

Political career 
In 2015, Aulepp succeeded Sarah Ryglewski as a member of the State Parliament of Bremen. In parliament, she served as her parliamentary group's spokesperson on legal affairs and chaired the Committee on Legal Affairs. From 2016 to 2021 she served as the chairperson of the SPD in Bremen.

Other activities 
 Stiftung Lesen, Member of the Board of Trustees
 German United Services Trade Union (ver.di), Member

References 

1970 births
Living people
Social Democratic Party of Germany politicians